Sokol is a rural locality (a settlement) in Savinskoye Rural Settlement, Permsky District, Perm Krai, Russia. The population was 1,674 as of 2010. There are 2 streets.

Geography 
Sokol is located 24 km southwest of Perm (the district's administrative centre) by road. Strashnaya is the nearest rural locality.

References 

Rural localities in Permsky District